Penguin Island (also known as Georges Island, Île Pingouin, Isla Pingüino, and Penguin Isle) is one of the smaller of the South Shetland Islands of Antarctica.

History
Penguin Island was sighted in January 1820 by a British expedition under Edward Bransfield, and so named by him because penguins occupied the shores of the island.

Description
It has a shoreline of low cliffs, with a beach on the north coast providing access. There is a small lake in the north-east. It is capped by Deacon Peak, a basaltic scoria cone. Deacon Peak was last thought to be active about 300 years ago. Petrel Crater, a maar crater, is located on the east side of the island, and is thought to have last erupted in or around 1905.

Geology
The island is the top of a Pleistocene-Recent stratovolcano within the Bransfield Basin.  The volcano has a base diameter of 8 km, and a height of 350 m.
Penguin island is the top third of the volcano. The crater is approximately 150 meters deep and is found above the vent of the volcano. There are two small black volcanic plugs visible in the red cinder cone crater. The Holocene volcano is related to the Shetland subduction zone north of the volcano.

Important Bird Area
The island has been identified as an Important Bird Area (IBA) by BirdLife International because it supports a wide range of seabirds including a breeding colony of over 600 pairs of southern giant petrels.  Other birds nesting at the site include Adélie and chinstrap penguins, Antarctic terns and kelp gulls.  Weddell and southern elephant seals regularly haul out.

See also 
 List of Antarctic and subantarctic islands
 List of volcanoes in Antarctica

References

External links
 Secretariat of the Antarctic Treaty Visitor Guidelines and island description
 Composite Antarctic Gazetteer.
 Information on the South Shetland Islands including Penguin Island.

Pleistocene stratovolcanoes
Holocene stratovolcanoes
Volcanoes of the South Shetland Islands
Maars of Antarctica
Islands of King George Island (South Shetland Islands)
Important Bird Areas of Antarctica
Seabird colonies
Penguin colonies